Prince Hall Masonic Temple may refer to:

Prince Hall Masonic Temple (Los Angeles, California), listed on the U.S. National Register of Historic Places (NRHP)
Prince Hall Masonic Temple (Baton Rouge, Louisiana), listed on the NRHP
Prince Hall Masonic Temple (Manhattan), New York City, New York
Prince Hall Masonic Temple (Washington, D.C.), listed on the NRHP

See also
List of Masonic buildings
Masonic Temple (disambiguation)